Hume Hall, built in 2002, is the Honors Residential College of the University of Florida, located on the western side of the university's Gainesville, Florida campus.

The current structure is the second at the university to bear the name.  The original Hume Hall was designed by Guy Fulton and built on the same site in 1958 as a conventional dormitory. It was demolished in 2000 to allow for construction of the current facility.

The University of Florida Honors Program offers housing for freshmen at Hume Hall.  This residentially-based academic community consists of two residence halls that integrate the housing needs of Honors residents with facilities, staff, and programs in support of the Honors Program. 

Hume Hall can be accommodate 608 residents, and is located in the heart of the University of Florida campus. The facility has a commons building, a number of multimedia-capable classrooms, faculty offices with an on-site academic advisors, a large activity room, and an information desk. The UF Student Honors Organization (SHO) also functions as the area government for Hume Hall.

Hume Hall is named for Harold Hume, dean of the College of Agriculture, provost, and interim president of the university.

See also 

 List of University of Florida buildings
 List of University of Florida presidents
 University of Florida student housing

References 

Buildings at the University of Florida
Guy Fulton buildings
2002 establishments in Florida
School buildings completed in 2002